Fran Meric is a Mexican actress, host and model. She was born in Veracruz, but moved to Mexico City when she was 11 years old. She studied acting in  Centro de Formacion Actoral of TV Azteca.

Personal life
She had a long relationship with Daniel Bisogno. She dated Leonardo Garcia before dating Raul Sandoval in 2011.

Filmography

TV
Relatos de Mujeres (2018) .... Katy Jurado
Muy padres .... Sofía Urrutia Gómez
Secretos de Familia .... Sandra Ventura
 Los Rey (2012) .... Jenny Laborde
A Corazón Abierto (2011) .... Cristina Solorzano
Asgaard (2009) .... Laya
Cambio de vida (2008) .... Cameo (the model)
La otra mitad del sol .... Isabel Medina

Host
Por fin el fin (2007)
Tempranito (1998)

References

External links
 

Living people
Mexican actresses
Mexican film actresses
Mexican telenovela actresses
Actresses from Mexico City
Actresses from Veracruz
Mexican people of Croatian descent
People educated at Centro de Estudios y Formación Actoral
Year of birth missing (living people)